Phlaeothripidae is a family of thrips with hundreds of genera. They are the only extant family of the suborder Tubulifera, alongside the extinct family Rohrthripidae and are themselves ordered into two subfamilies, the Idolothripinae with 80 genera, and the Phlaeothripinae with almost 400. Some 3,400 species are recognised in this family, and many are fungivores living in the tropics.

Thrips from this family are fairly common, and are generally larger than those in the suborder Terebrantia (containing all other thrips). Idolothrips marginatus can attain a body length of up to 14 mm. The group is distinguished by having the last abdominal segment modified into a tube-like structure – hence the suborder's name, which means "tube-bearers".

Selected species
Some of the better-known species are:
 Aleurothrips fasciapennis (Franklin) - feeds on whiteflies
 Gynaikothrips ficorum (Marchal) - Cuban laurel thrips
 Haplothrips froggatti Hood - Black plague thrips
 Haplothrips gowdeyi (Franklin) - Goldtipped tubular thrips
 Haplothrips niger (Osborne) - Red clover thrips
 Haplothrips victoriensis Bagnall - Tubular black thrips
 Idolothrips spectrum Haliday - Giant thrips
 Leptothrips mali Fitch - Black hunter, is used to control mites
 Liothrips urichi Karny - Clidemia thrips
 Liothrips vaneeckei Priesner - Lily thrips, damages the bulbs of lilies
 Teuchothrips disjunctus (Hood) - Bottlebrush thrips
 Hoplandrothrips - causes leaf rolling of Coffea plants

References

External links

 Gynaikothrips ficorum, Cuban laurel thrips on the UF / IFAS Featured Creatures Web site

 
Insect families